Otago is one of the few regions of New Zealand to have officially adopted a flag.

Otago has long been associated with several symbols and colours. The St. Andrew's Cross is one such symbol, in recognition of the former province's Scottish settlement. Another, used on the original arms of the province, is the eight-pointed star.

Traditionally, the province (as the region is still called) has always been associated with the colours blue and gold, these colours representing Otago's original foundation, on the wealth of gold taken from the rivers of the province during the 1860s gold rush. The blue also again harks back to the flag of Scotland.

For many years, these colours were seen in a wide variety of different designs intended to represent Otago. Popular designs included flags quartered in blue and gold, or in blue with a gold saltire. A vertically divided design in blue and gold with the word "Otago" in white fimbriated in black was also popular and can still be seen in use in the province.

In 2004, a campaign was started by prominent local author and regional councillor Neville Peat to decide on a design for a flag for the region as a whole (and more specifically for use by the Otago Regional Council).

The design (chosen in late 2004 from several hundred entries submitted) was designed by Gregor Macaulay. It is blazoned Per fess dancetty azure and or, two mullets of eight points in pale counterchanged. The design represents the blue skies over the hills of Otago separated by a zigzag dividing line, similar to that found on the flag of the province's main centre, Dunedin. The two eight-pointed stars were taken from the former Otago Provincial Council's seal, and also represent the sun shining over the lakes and the hills of Central Otago.

References

Flag
Flags of New Zealand
Flags adopted through competition
Otago